Jack Johnston (11 December 1887 – 28 November 1962) was an Australian rules footballer who played with Melbourne in the Victorian Football League (VFL).		

His brother Charlie also played football with Melbourne.

Notes

External links 

1887 births
1962 deaths
Australian rules footballers from Victoria (Australia)
Melbourne Football Club players